Winchelsea Beach is a seaside village in the parish of Icklesham in the Rother district of East Sussex, England. The village is located about ten miles (15 km) east of Hastings, and about 1.5 miles (2 km) south east of Winchelsea.

The beach itself faces Rye Bay, the estuary of the River Rother. At high tide it is composed of shingle, which is normal on this stretch of coastline; whilst at low tide an expanse of mud and sand is revealed. Many species of birds frequent the sands and the surrounding marshland of Rye Harbour Nature Reserve.

The village has facilities including: a church, Co-op store, two pubs,  and a post office. There are two large holiday sites - Rye Bay and Winchelsea Sands Caravan Parks.

Gallery

References

External links
Village website
Winchelsea Beach Community Association

Populated coastal places in East Sussex
Icklesham